William Stephen Flynn (December 25, 1890 – January 24, 1944) was a prominent golf course architect during the early part of the 20th century. Flynn is most noted for designing Shinnecock Hills Golf Club on Long Island and Cherry Hills Country Club, Lancaster Country Club, and for his work at the Merion Golf Club.

Flynn, along with A.W. Tillinghast, George C. Thomas, Jr., Hugh Wilson, George Crump, and William Fownes together made up the "Philadelphia School" of golf course architecture. Together, the group designed over 300 courses, 27 of which are on in the top 100 golf courses in the world.

Life and career 
Flynn was born in Milton, Massachusetts.  He graduated from Milton High School, where he had played interscholastic golf and competed against his friend Francis Ouimet.  He laid out his first course at Heartwellville, Vermont, in 1909 working under the direction of his brother in law Frederick Pickering who was considered the “king of golf course constructors” in the beginning of the century.  Pickering constructed the first Merion Course and William Flynn worked for him at the time.  Although Pickering was supposed to construct the Merion East after a disagreement, Flynn was hired to assist Hugh Wilson with completion of the East Course at Merion Golf Club in Ardmore, Pennsylvania.  He worked as the construction supervisor at Merion and remained on as superintendent for a short time, helping establish the course.

Flynn continued his involvement with Merion for 25 years, perfecting the course. He and Wilson had hoped to form a design partnership, but Wilson's failing health prevented it. Instead, Flynn partnered with Howard Toomey just after World War I with Flynn the designer and Toomey handling the engineering side of the work. They started their own golf architectural firm, Toomey & Flynn. William Gordon, Robert Lawrence and Dick Wilson all started out as assistants with the firm of Toomey and Flynn and all later became prominent designers in their own right. Flynn was particularly active around Philadelphia, Pennsylvania, producing numerous highly rated courses which compete with each other for attention.  Although his body of work is found around Philadelphia, his most recognizable work is outside the area at places like Cherry Hills Country Club in Denver, The Cascades in Virginia, The Country Club in Brookline, Massachusetts, Woodcrest Country Club in Cherry Hill, New Jersey and Shinnecock Hills on Long Island.  In 1927, Flynn added the Primrose nine at The Country Club. Three holes from the Primrose are used on the course's Composite Course for the U.S. Open, but much of Flynn's renovation work at The Country Club goes unnoticed.

The climax of Flynn's career would be Shinnecock Hills Golf Club, where he had his finest site and certainly produced his greatest work. Toomey and Flynn were hired to redesign the original course in 1931 with the addition of new land to build the back nine. Flynn kept only two holes from the original course in a total makeover. Shinnecock is praised for its beautiful routing and Flynn's use of the natural terrain. It is currently ranked third in Golf Digest's 100 Greatest Courses Ranking, the highest of any course Flynn was involved in. Flynn died at the age of 53 in Philadelphia.

Courses designed by Flynn 

Atlantic City Country Club - Atlantic City, New Jersey
Bala Golf Club - Philadelphia, Pennsylvania
Beaver Dam Golf Club - Prince George's, Maryland
 Boca Raton Resort North Course (later replaced by Boca Country Club) - Boca Raton, Florida
 Boca Raton Resort South Course - Boca Raton, Florida
Brinton Lake Club (Now Concord Country Club) - Concordville, Pennsylvania
Burning Tree Club (Construction) - Bethesda, Maryland
Cascades Golf Course (Homestead Resort) - Hot Springs, Virginia
Robert Cassatt Estate Course - Bryn Mawr, Pennsylvania
Cherry Hills Country Club - Cherry Hills Village, Colorado
Cleveland Heights Country Club - Lakeland, Florida
Cobb's Creek Golf Club (Co-design) - Philadelphia, Pennsylvania
Concord Country Club Chadds Ford, Pennsylvania
The Country Club - Brookline, Massachusetts
The Country Club - Pepper Pike, Ohio
The Country Club of Harrisburg - Harrisburg, Pennsylvania
The Country Club of Virginia (Plans for 36 holes) - Richmond, Virginia
The Country Club of York (Plans for 18 holes) - York, Pennsylvania
Denver Country Club (Redesign) - Denver, Colorado
Doylestown Country Club (9 holes) - Doylestown, Pennsylvania
Eagles Mere Country Club (Redesign 6 existing holes, Design remaining 12/ also designed 11 holes of a second course that was never finished and abandoned) - Eagles Mere, Pennsylvania
Elyria Country Club - Elyria, Ohio
Floranada South Course - Floranada, Florida
Friendship Golf Course (Edward McLean Estate Course) - Washington, DC
Glen View Club (Redesign) - Golf, Illinois
Green Valley Country Club - Lafayette Hill, Pennsylvania
Gulph Mills Golf Club (Construction) - Gulph Mills, Pennsylvania
The Homestead Golf Course (Redesign) – Hot Springs, Virginia
Huntingdon Valley Country Club – Huntingdon Valley, Pennsylvania
Indian Creek Country Club – Indian Creek Village, Florida
Indian Spring Country Club - Silver Springs, Maryland
Kilkare Course (William Plunkett Private Course) - Heartwellville, Vermont
The Kittansett Club – Marion, Massachusetts
Lancaster Country Club – Lancaster, Pennsylvania
Lehigh Country Club – Allentown, Pennsylvania
Manor Country Club – Rockville, Maryland
JF Manne Miniature Golf Course - Ocean City, NJ
Manufacturers Golf & Country Club – Oreland, Pennsylvania
Marble Hall Golf Course (Now Green Valley Country Club) – Lafayette Hill, Pennsylvania
McCall Field Club - Philadelphia, Pennsylvania
Merion Golf Club East Course (Design and Redesign) - Ardmore, Pennsylvania
Merion Golf Club West Course (Design and Redesign) - Ardmore, Pennsylvania
Miami Beach Polo Club (Plans for 18 holes) - Miami Beach, Florida
Mill Road Farm Golf Course (Albert Lasker Private Course) - Lake Forest, Illinois
Monroe Country Club (9 holes) - Monroe, New York
Normandy Shores Golf Club - Normandy Shores, Florida
North Hills Country Club (Redesign) - North Hills, Pennsylvania
Ole Monterey Golf Club - Roanoke, Virginia
Onondaga Golf and Country Club (Redesign) - Fayetteville, New York
Opa Locka Golf Course - Opa Locka, Florida
Overbrook Country Club (Redesign) - Overbrook, Pennsylvania
Penn Athletic Club Indoor Course - Philadelphia, Pennsylvania
Pepper Pike Club – Pepper Pike, Ohio
Philadelphia Country Club – Gladwyne, Pennsylvania
Philadelphia Cricket Club (Redesign) - Flourtown, Pennsylvania
Philmont Country Club North Course (Redesign) - – Huntingdon Valley, Pennsylvania
Pine Meadow Golf Course - Mundelein, Illinois
Pine Valley Golf Club (Redesign) - Pine Valley, New Jersey
Plymouth Country Club (9 holes) - Plymouth, North Carolina
Plymouth Country Club – Plymouth Meeting, Pennsylvania
Pocantico Hills Golf Course (Rockefeller Private Course) - Tarrytown, New York
Pocono Manor East Course (Design and Redesign) - [Pocono Manor, Pennsylvania]
Rock Creek Park Golf Course - Washington, DC
Rolling Green Golf Club – Springfield, Pennsylvania
Seaview Country Club Pines Course (9 holes) - Galloway, New Jersey
Sewell's Point Country Club (Now Norfolk Country Club) - Norfolk, Virginia
Shinnecock Hills Golf Club – Shinnecock Hills, New York
The Springhaven Club (Redesign) - (Wallingford, Pennsylvania)
Springdale Golf Club (Redesign) - Princeton, New Jersey
Sunnehanna Country Club (Redesign 3-holes) - Sunnehanna, Pennsylvania
Sunnybrook Golf Club (Design and Redesign) - Lafayette Hill, Pennsylvania
Town and Country Club (Now Woodmont Country Club) - Rockville, Maryland
U.S. Naval Academy Golf Club – Annapolis, Maryland
Wampanoag Country Club (Redesign) - Swansea, Massachusetts
Washington Golf and Country Club (Design and Redesign) - Arlington, Virginia
Westchester Biltmore Country Club (Now Westchester Country Club) (Construction and Redesign) - Westchester, New York
Whitemarsh Valley Country Club (Redesign) - Whitemarsh, Pennsylvania
Women's National Golf and Tennis Club (Now Glen Head Country Club) (Redesign) - Glen Head, New York
Woodcrest Country Club – Cherry Hill, New Jersey
Woodward Estate Golf Course (Dr. G. Woodward Private Course) - Chestnut Hill, Pennsylvania
Yorktown Country Club River View Course - Yorktown, Virginia
Yorktown Country Club Lake View Course (Plans for 18 holes) - Yorktown, Virginia

References 

Golf course architects
People from Milton, Massachusetts
1890 births
1944 deaths
Sportspeople from Norfolk County, Massachusetts